Dunbar is an unincorporated community in Good Hope Township, Itasca County, Minnesota, United States.  The community is located northwest of Squaw Lake at the junction of Itasca County Roads 32 and 149.  State Highway 46 (MN 46) is nearby.

Nearby places include Max, Squaw Lake, Alvwood, Northome, and Blackduck.

ZIP codes 56630 (Blackduck) and 56681 (Squaw Lake) meet near Dunbar.  A post office previously operated in the community of Dunbar from 1913 to 1933.

There is also a small town called Dunbar located in East Lothian, Scotland.

References

 Official State of Minnesota Highway Map – 2011/2012 edition
 Mn/DOT map of Itasca County – Sheet 2 – 2011 edition

Unincorporated communities in Minnesota
Unincorporated communities in Itasca County, Minnesota